Robert Alexander Gilbert (Born c. 1870, Natural Bridge, Virginia; died January 7, 1942, Cambridge, Massachusetts) was an African-American nature photographer.  Gilbert was a helper and field assistant to ornithologist William Brewster from 1896 or 1897 until Brewster's death in 1919 and was later employed at the Museum of Comparative Zoology at Harvard. His photographic work while employed by Brewster went uncredited until the publication of a book-length biography on Gilbert by John Hanson Mitchell, Looking for Mr. Gilbert: The Unlikely Life of the First African American Landscape Photographer.

References

1870 births
1942 deaths
Nature photographers
African-American photographers
Photographers from Virginia
People from Rockbridge County, Virginia
20th-century African-American people